Emma Cattle (born 10 April 1988 in Luton) is a British Paralympian competing in S10 events. She competed at the 2008 Summer Paralympics, and won medals at the 2009 and 2011 IPC Swimming European Championships.

Personal life
Cattle has cerebral palsy. She attended Barnfield College.

Career
Cattle trains at Luton swimming club, and competes in S10 and SM10 events. She began swimming aged 8 at her local swimming club in Luton. She was selected to compete at the 2008 Paralympics, coming sixth in the final of the 100 metre backstroke S10 competition. She also competed in the 50 metre freestyle S10, where she finished last in her heat, and the Women's 200 m individual medley SM10, where she was disqualified in her heat. Cattle qualified to compete at the 2009 IPC Swimming European Championships, her third appearance at the event. She won a bronze medal in the 400 metre freestyle S10. In 2009, Cattle broke the British 100m backstroke S10 record with a time of 1:12.55; her record was later broken in 2013. At the 2011 IPC Swimming European Championships, Cattle won a silver medal in the 100 metres backstroke S10 event; her time in the event was a national record. She also set a national record in the 50 metres freestyle event, and set personal bests in the 100 metres freestyle and 200m individual medley events.

Cattle failed to qualify for the 2012 Summer Paralympics after finishing eighth in the 400m mixed category freestyle final at the British Championships. In 2015, Cattle won the mixed category 100m freestyle C final of a 2015 British Para-Swimming International Meet event in Glasgow. She also competed in the 50m and 100m freestyle and 100m backstroke events in the East Region Winter Championships.

References

External links
 

1988 births
Living people
Sportspeople from Luton
English female swimmers
English disabled sportspeople
Swimmers with cerebral palsy
Swimmers at the 2008 Summer Paralympics
Paralympic swimmers of Great Britain
S10-classified Paralympic swimmers
British female backstroke swimmers
British female freestyle swimmers
21st-century British women